KK Solin is a basketball club based in Solin, Croatia. The club currently competes in the A-2 Liga, the second tier in Croatian basketball. From 1990 to 2002, Solin was co-operating with KK Split.

Players

Notable players

Damir Rančić
Drago Pašalić
Hrvoje Perić

External links
Official Facebook page

Basketball teams in Croatia
Basketball teams established in 1969